European Conference on Radar in Meteorology and Hydrology (ERAD) is an international scientific conference that is organised every two years from 2000.

The idea of ERAD, which has been perpetuated since its first edition in 2000, is to create an open forum between students, academics, engineers, end users and operational radar operators working with or using weather radars and weather radar data. The goal of this conference is to facilitate mutual understanding between data producers and data users and to help young generations accessing state-of-the-art knowledge on radars, radar signal and radar applications through communication with the most renowned scientists of the field.

Previous ERADs 
 2000 – Bologna, Italy, chairman: Peter Meischner (DLR).
 2002 – Delft, Netherlands, chairman: Herman Russchenberg (TUD).
 2004 – Visby, Sweden, chairman: Daniel Michelson (SMHI).
 2006 – Barcelona, Spain, chairman: Daniel Sempere-Torres (CRAHI-UPC, UPC).
 2008 – Helsinki, Finland, chairman: Jarmo Koistinen (FMI).
 2010 – Sibiu, Romania, chairwoman: Aurora Bell (Administratia Nationala de Meteorologie, Romania).
 2012 – Toulouse, France, chairmans: Olivier Bousquet and Pierre Tabary (Météo-France).
 2014 – Garmisch-Partenkirchen, Germany, co-chairs: Kathleen Helmert and Martin Hagen (DWD-DLR, Germany).
 2016 – Antalya, Turkey, co-chairs: Ali Tokay and Kurtulus Ozturk (Turkish State Meteorological Service, Turkey).
 2018 – Utrecht, Netherlands, co-chairs: Hidde Leijnse (KNMI) and Remko Uijlenhoet (Wageningen University).

Next ERAD 
 2022 – Locarno, Switzerland, co-chairs: Urs Germann (MeteoSwiss) and Alexis Berne (EPFL).

See also 
 Weather radar

External links 
 ERAD 2006 website
 ERAD 2008 website
 ERAD 2010 website
 ERAD 2012 website
 ERAD 2014 website
 ERAD 2016 website
 ERAD 2018 website
 ERAD 2022 website

References 

Earth science conferences